Vitorino Salomé Vieira (born 11 July 1942), commonly known simply as Vitorino, is a Portuguese singer-songwriter. His music combines the traditional music of his native region of Alentejo and urban popular song.

Discography

Albums
 Semear Salsa ao Reguinho (LP, Orfeu, 1975) co-produced with Fausto Bordalo Dias
 Se fores ao Alentejo
 Semear salsa ao reguinho
 Cantiga dum marginal do séc.XIX
 A Primavera do Outono
 Ó patrão dê-me um cigarro
 São saias, senhor, são saias
 Dizem p'ra 'í que chegou
 Cantiga de uma greve de Verão
 Temos a força dos ventos
 O tudo é todo nosso
 Menina estás à janela
 Morra quem não tem amores
 Vou-me embora vou partir
 Os Malteses (LP, Orfeu, 1977)
 Alentejo és nossa terra
 Rouxinol repenica o cante
 Oh Beja, terrível Beja
 Barrancos és minha terra
 Saias da União Cooperativa do Redondo
 O maltês
 Cantares do mês d' Outubro
 Fui colher uma romã
 Marcha da patuleia
 Chamaste-me extravagante
 Maio
 Lindo ramo verde escuro
 Não Há Terra Que Resista – Contraponto (LP, Orfeu, 1979)
 Delicada da cintura
 Não há terra que resista
 Litania para um amor ausente
 Contos do príncipe real
 Maria dos mil sorrisos
 Maria da Fonte
 Dá-me cá os braços teus
 Porque me não vês Joana
 Quadras soltas (de embalar)
 Viva a rainha do sul
 Diz a laranja ao limão
 Sedas a vento
 Romances (LP, Orfeu, 1981)
 Catrapiado
 Laurinda
 Dona Filomena
 Bela Nau Catarineta
 Eu hei-de amar uma pedra
 Em 25 de Março
 Senhora Maria
 Levantar ferros
 Mana Isabel
 Sospirastes baldovinos
 Indo eu por 'í abaixo
 Oh! que janela tão alta
 Flor de La Mar (LP, EMI, 1983)
 Leitaria Garrett (LP, EMI, 1984)
 Abertura
 Saias da vila do Redondo
 Menina estás à janela
 Postal para D.João III (ao Zeca Afonso)
 Cantiga partindo-se
 Poema
 Ai os modos de ser lágrima
 Confissões (Nunca fui além)
 Leitaria Garrett
 Andando pela vida (a )
 Tragédia da rua das Gáveas
 Tinta verde
 Carbonárias (final)
 Sul (LP, EMI, 1985)
 Negro Fado (LP, EMI, 1988) PJA
 Cantigas de Encantar (Cassette, EMI, 1989)
 Eu Que Me Comovo Por Tudo e Por Nada (CD, EMI, 1992) PJA
 As Mais Bonitas (Compilação, EMI, 1993)
 A Canção do Bandido (CD, EMI, 1995) CAND PJA
 Fado alexandrino
 Tocador da concertina
 Fado triste
 Fado da prostituta da rua S. António da Glória
 Nasci para morrer contigo
 Fado do pedinte da Igreja dos Mártires
 Cruel vento
 Fado Isabel
 Veste de noite este quarto
 Fado da pré-reforma
 Rigoroso do pescador da marginal
 Fado do jovem velho
 Os nomes do amor
 La Habana 99 (CD, EMI, 1999) with Septeto Habanero
 Alentejanas e Amorosas (CD, EMI, 2001)
 As Mais Bonitas 2 – Ao Alcançe da Mão (Compilation, EMI, 2002)
 Utopia (CD, EMI, 2004) with Janita Salomé
 Ninguém Nos Ganha Aos Matraquilhos! (CD, EMI, 2004)
 Tudo (Compilation, EMI, 2006)
 Abril, Abrilzinho (CD, Público/Praça das Flores, 2006)
 Ao Vivo- Vitorino a preto e branco (CD, Magic Music/Vitorino, 2007)
 Tango (CD, Magic Music/Vitorino, 2009)
 Viva a República (CD de dois originais, comemoração centenário implantação da República, Diário de Notícias/Montepio, 2010)

Other compilations
Queda do Império – Colecção Caravela (Compilation, EMI, 1997)
O Melhor dos Melhores nº 43 (Compilation, Movieplay, 1996)
Clássicos da Renascença nº 84 (Compilation, Movieplay, 2000)
Menina Estás À Janela – Colecção Caravelas (Compilation, EMI, 2004)
Grandes Êxitos (Compilation, EMI, 2006)

Singles
Morra Quem Não Tem Amores (Single, 1974)
Menina Estás À Janela/Tinta Verde dos Teus Olhos (Single, Orfeu, 1983)
Joana Rosa (Máxi, EMI, 1986)

References

External links 

 Official website

1942 births
Living people
20th-century Portuguese male singers
People from Évora District
Portuguese fado singers
Portuguese anarchists